Chantavoine may refer to:

Henri Chantavoine (1850–1918), a French writer and professor of rhetoric
Jean Chantavoine (1877–1952), a French musicologist

Also:
 Curé Chantavoine, a character in Mademoiselle Fifi, an opera by the Russian composer César Cui